Van Dale's Great Dictionary of the Dutch Language, called   for short, is the leading dictionary of the Dutch language. The latest edition was published in April 2022.

History

Van Dale's dictionary was first published after the death of Johan Hendrik van Dale, who had started work on his New Dictionary of the Dutch Language in 1867. This was built upon the original same-named 1864 dictionary of I.M. Calisch and N.S. Calisch. Van Dale did not see the new work published in his lifetime, as he died in 1872. It was finished by his student Jan Manhave. Today it is published by the private company Van Dale Lexicografie.

It is usually updated every 7–8 years, and the 15th edition was published in 2015. Today there are compilations, pocket editions, electronic editions on CD-ROM and an online edition on the Van Dale website. The online edition includes a free version for the more common words, and a subscription-based professional version with access to the full 90,000-word dictionary.

Position 
The Van Dale Dictionary is a private endeavor, to be distinguished from the government-published "Green Booklet" that lists the official spelling mandated for schools and government employees. Van Dale includes the official spelling of the words as well, but it further provides their definitions.

There have been arguments whether inclusion in Van Dale should be understood as an approval, in particular for words considered discriminatory like  ("negro", but traditionally not used in a derogatory sense in Dutch). The position of the editors is clear: the actual use is decisive. Disapproved words are marked as such, but not omitted. The purpose is to inform the reader, therefore the responsibility of using certain words lies solely on them.

Editions

See also
 Dutch Language Union
 Woordenboek der Nederlandsche Taal
 Word list of the Dutch language

References

External links

  
 Van Dale, 14th edition at the Library of Congress
 Van Dale, 14th edition at WorldCat

Dutch dictionaries
Dutch language
1864 non-fiction books
1874 non-fiction books
1884 non-fiction books
1898 non-fiction books
1914 non-fiction books
1924 non-fiction books
1950 non-fiction books
1961 non-fiction books
1970 non-fiction books
1976 non-fiction books
1984 non-fiction books
1992 non-fiction books
1995 non-fiction books
1999 non-fiction books
2005 non-fiction books
2015 non-fiction books
Dutch non-fiction literature
Dutch culture